Bradley Welch (born January 14, 1989) is a Trinidadian and Tobagonian American footballer who currently plays for the Central Florida Panthers SC in the National Premier Soccer League. Welch has represented Trinidad and Tobago at national level.

Career
Welch began his youth career with his high school team Cypress Creek High School where he earned several honors. Following high school he signed with Rollins College where he was first called up to Trinidad and Tobago U23s. In 2009, he signed for F.C. New York in their inaugural season in the USL pro, the professional third tier in the United States. After an unsuccessful season he moved to the San Juan Jabloteh in the Trinidad and Tobago TT Pro League. This was to be a short lived move, only scoring once in a stint lasting less than 10 games. As a result, he moved to Australia where he signed with Illawarra Premier League club Dapto Dandaloo in the hope of securing a move to the A-League.

Following a solid 2014 season with Dapto Dandaloo in which he scored 5 goals, Welch signed with South Coast Wolves in the National Premier Leagues NSW for the 2015 New South Wales National Premier Leagues Men's 1 season. 

In March of 2019, he was added to the brand new National Premier Soccer League team based out of Orlando, Florida the Central Florida Panthers SC.

International career
Welch has represented Trinidad and Tobago at U23 level.

References

External links
 
 

1989 births
Living people
Trinidad and Tobago footballers
Trinidad and Tobago expatriate footballers
F.C. New York players
San Juan Jabloteh F.C. players
Expatriate soccer players in Australia
Expatriate soccer players in the United States
USL Championship players
TT Pro League players
National Premier Soccer League players
Association football forwards